The Ambassador of Malaysia to the United States of America is the head of Malaysia's diplomatic mission to the United States. The position has the rank and status of an Ambassador Extraordinary and Plenipotentiary and is based in the Embassy of Malaysia, Washington, D.C.

List of heads of mission

Ambassadors to the United States

See also
Malaysia–United States relations

References

Malaysian ambassadors to the United States, List of
 
United States